Kevin José Serapio Oviedo, known as Kevin Serapio (born 9 April 1996) is a Nicaraguan football player. He plays for Managua.

International
He made his Nicaragua national football team debut on 3 March 2019 in a friendly against Bolivia.

He was selected for the 2019 CONCACAF Gold Cup squad.

References

External links
 
 

1996 births
People from the North Caribbean Coast Autonomous Region
Living people
Nicaraguan men's footballers
Nicaragua international footballers
Association football midfielders
Managua F.C. players
Nicaraguan Primera División players
2019 CONCACAF Gold Cup players